Thirteen Terrors (stylized as ThirTEEN Terrors and known in Thai as Phuean Hian.. Rongrian Lon is a 2014–2015 Thai horror television drama produced by GTH. The series is an anthology of shorts, with thirteen episodes, each by a different director, and follows a school-secrets horror theme. The series was broadcast on the satellite channel GTH On Air and the new digital terrestrial channel GMM 25.

Episode and Cast

Episode 1: Wanida (วนิดา) 

 Sananthachat Thanapatpisal as Manaswee Thanapatpisan
 Panisara Montharat as Wanida Punyaangkun
 Weeranan Sadakorawongwat as Kornkanok Loetpiriya
 Suraphon Poonpiriya as Teacher
 Nitcha Thitikananon as Manaswee's Mother
 Boonchoo Namjaidee as School security guard

Episode 2: Follow to death (ตาย-ตาม) 

 Sutatta Udomsilp as Im
 Parada Thitawachira as Jen
 Teetatch Ratanasritai as Ball

Episode 3: Curse (แช่ง) 

 Chawinroj Likitcharoensakul as Jo
 Kemisara Paladesh as Aim
 Kanit Wichianwanitchakun as Get / Thachai Kamonploy

Episode 4: Uninvited line (สายไม่ได้รับ (เชิญ)) 

 Thiti Mahayotaruk as Nae
 Napat Chokejindachai as Dew
 Apasiri Nitibhon as Nae's Mother
 Wongravee Nateetorn as Gab
 Nitithorn Akkarachotsophon as Dew's friends

Episode 5: Pu Som (ปู่โสม) 

 Narikun Ketprapakorn as Wan
 Sirinya Tantipongwatthana as Cherry
 Suchada Poonpatthanasuk as Wan's Mother
 Atchariya Kamonpan as Cherry's best friend

Episode 6: Scare beautiful (สวยสยอง) 

 Chutavuth Pattarakampol as Aun
 Thunyanun Pipatchaisiri as Fun Promthida Arisuk (in Music)
 Wassana Chalakorn as Sri Aunt
 Chulalak Thepissaradech as Fun (real)
 Natchapongtorn Kesornsuwan as Tot (Aun's Friends)

Episode 7: Break the rules in night (คืนแหกกฎ) 

 Sirachuch Chienthavorn as Nut
 Sikarin Setsurapricha as J.
 Chirayus Khaobaimai as Now
 Phakamas Kanchanaburangkoon as Pai
 Theeracha Raiwa as Khem
 Chompoo Prasert as Security guard

Episode 8: Secretly taking shots (แอบถ่าย) 

 Gunn Junhavat as Turk
 Saruda Kietwarawuth as Orm
 Thanyaluck Chokthanadech as Mind
 Natnicha Leuanganankun as Deedee
 Daisuke Sukikawa as Thada Teacher
 Laksanaporn Kotkunthara as Kib

Episode 9: Instinct (อจินไตย) 

 Nichaphat Chatchaipholrat as Palm paradee
 Phawadee Kumchokpaisan as Bee chonthicha
 Pimlapat Surapan as Thip Thipwan
 Narinlaya Kunmongkolpet as View witchuda
 Pimmada Thaisomboonsuk as Abha Teacher

Episode 10: Stains (คราบ) 

 Kanyawee Songmuang as Tong Thitima Kasempaisan
 Chananya Saendech as Praew
 Awat Rattanapintha as Jack
 Chirawat Wachirasaranpat as Teacher Wanchana Srikansakun
 Chinchutha Rattanaburi as Pinto Naphaphorn Wangchertwong/Weerakietdamrong

Episode 11: Roommate (เพื่อนร่วมห้อง) 

 Athittaya Craigg as Nina
 Chanthana Kitiyapan as Su Aunt
 Worawuth Rithreuang as Nina's Uncle
 Alexsandra Abbing as Jamie (Nina's friends)

Episode 12: Sound on the line (เสียงตามสาย) 

 Sarit Tarailoetwichia as Att
 Teeradon Supapunpinyo as Game
 Nareupornkamol Chaisaeng as Dear
 Adithep Anan as Oh
 Theerawuth Hiranyawatthanangkoon as Song
 Thanyaboon Boonprasert as Wisarut
 Sumontha Suanpholrat as Nath Teacher
 Saifa Tanthana as Taweewat Teacher

Episode 13: Blue Night (คืนสีน้ำเงิน) 

 Oabnithi Wiwattanawarang as Poom
 Atthaphan Phunsawat as Tam
 Panatchai Kittisatima as Tam's Brother
 Duangjai Hirunsri as Tam's Mother

Episode 14: ThirTEEN Terrors Awards 

 Napat Chokejindachai as MC

References 

Television series by GMM Tai Hub
2014 Thai television series debuts
Horror drama television series
2015 Thai television series endings